Roscoe Karns (September 7, 1891 – February 6, 1970) was an American actor who appeared in nearly 150 films between 1915 and 1964. He specialized in cynical, wise-cracking (and often tipsy) characters, and his rapid-fire delivery enlivened many comedies and crime thrillers in the 1930s and 1940s.

Acting career
Karns began acting with a San Diego stock company when he was still in high school. "I’ve never earned a dime outside of show business. I can't even claim having a newspaper route as a kid," he claimed.

Though he appeared in numerous silent films, such as Wings and Beggars of Life, his career didn't really take off until sound arrived. Arguably his best-known film role was the annoying bus passenger Oscar Shapeley, who tries to pick up Claudette Colbert in the Oscar-winning comedy It Happened One Night, (1934) quickly followed by one of his best performances as the boozy press agent Owen O'Malley in Howard Hawks' Twentieth Century. (Six years later, he co-starred as one of the reporters in another Hawks classic, His Girl Friday.) In 1937, Paramount teamed him with Lynne Overman as a pair of laconic private eyes in two B comedy-mysteries, Murder Goes to College and Partners in Crime.

By the late 1940s Karns was finding it difficult to obtain movie roles, and was considering retiring, but he contacted a friend who worked for the DuMont Television Network, and he was asked to consider coming to New York City to act on television. From 1950 to 1954, Karns played the title role in the popular DuMont Television Network series Rocky King, Inside Detective. His son, character actor Todd Karns, also appeared in that series.

From 1959 to 1962, Karns was cast as Captain (then Admiral) Walter Shafer in seventy-three of the ninety-five episodes of the CBS military sitcom/drama series, Hennesey, starring Jackie Cooper in the title role of a United States Navy physician, and Abby Dalton as nurse Martha Hale.

His final film was another Hawks comedy, Man's Favorite Sport?, in 1964.

Personal life
Roscoe Karns was born September 7, 1891, in San Bernardino, California. He married Mary M. Frasco in 1920, and was the father of two children – Mary Karns Hart, and Roscoe Todd Karns, Jr. He died at St. Vincent's Hospital, in Los Angeles, on February 6, 1970, after more than a month of hospitalization.

Filmography

 Mr. Carlson of Arizona (1915, Short)
 From Champion to Tramp (1915, Short) - The Girl's Father
 A Western Governor's Humanity (1915, Short)
 Beans for Two (1918, Short) - Jimmy's Friend
 Know Thy Wife (1918, Short) - Steve - Bob's Chum
 Brides for Two (1919, short)
 Sally's Blighted Career (1919, Short)
 Oh, Susie, Be Careful (1919, Short)
 Poor Relations (1919) - Henry
 The Family Honor (1920) - Dal Tucker
 Life of the Party (1920) - Sam Perkins
 The Man Tamer (1921) - Bradley P. Caldwell Jr
 Too Much Married (1921) - Bob Holiday
 Her Own Money (1922) - Jerry Woodward
 The Trouper (1922) - Neal Selden
 Afraid to Fight (1922) - Bertie
 Conquering the Woman (1922) - Shorty Thompson
 Other Men's Daughters (1923) - Hubert
 Down to the Ship to See (1923, Short) - Jack
 The Ten Commandments (1923) - The Boy in the Rain (uncredited)
 Bluff (1924) - Jack Hallowell
 The Midnight Express (1924) - Switch Hogan
 The Foolish Virgin (1924) - Chuck Brady
 The Overland Limited (1925) - Patrick Henry Madden
 Dollar Down (1925) - Gene Meadows
 You'd Be Surprised (1926) - Party Guest (uncredited)
 Ritzy (1927) - Smith's Valet
 Wings (1927) - Lieutenant Cameron
 Ten Modern Commandments (1927) - Benny Burnaway
 The Jazz Singer (1927) - Agent (uncredited)
 Beau Sabreur (1928) - Buddy
 The Trail of '98 (1928) - Man on Ship (uncredited)
 Something Always Happens (1928) - George
 The Desert Bride (1928) - Pvt. Terry
 The Vanishing Pioneer (1928) - Ray Hearn
 Warming Up (1928) - Hippo
 Jazz Mad (1928) - Sol Levy
 Win That Girl (1928) - Johnny Norton II
 Beggars of Life (1928) - Lame Hoppy
 Moran of the Marines (1928) - Swatty
 Object: Alimony (1928) - Al Bryant
 The Shopworn Angel (1928) - Dance Director
 The Flying Fleet (1929) - Shipwrecked Radio Operator (uncredited)
 Copy (1929 short) - City Editor John Mack
 This Thing Called Love (1929) - Harry Bertrand
 New York Nights (1929) - Johnny Dolan
 Troopers Three (1930) - Bugs
 Safety in Numbers (1930) - Bertram Shapiro
 The Little Accident (1930) - Gilbert
 Man Trouble (1930) - Scott
 The Costello Case (1930) - Blair
 The Gorilla (1930) - Simmons
 Dirigible (1931) - Sock McGuire
 Many a Slip (1931) - Stan Price
 Laughing Sinners (1931) - Fred Geer
 Pleasure (1931) - Arnie
 Left Over Ladies (1931) - 'Scoop'
 Ladies of the Big House (1931) - Frank - Twenty Questions player (uncredited)
 High Pressure (1932) - Telephone salesman (uncredited)
 Stowaway (1932) - Insp. Redding
 Play Girl (1932) - Gambler (uncredited)
 The Roadhouse Murder (1932) - Jeff Dale
 Week-End Marriage (1932) - Jim Davis
 Two Against the World (1932) - Segall, reporter
 The Crooked Circle (1932) - Harry Carter
 One Way Passage (1932) - S.S.Maloa Bartender (uncredited)
 Night After Night (1932) - Leo
 They Call It Sin (1932) - Brandt - Rehearsal Director (uncredited)
 If I Had a Million (1932) - Private O'Brien
 Under-Cover Man (1932) - Dannie
 Lawyer Man (1932) - Merritt - Reporter (uncredited)
 Grand Slam (1933) - Contest Radio Announcer
 Today We Live (1933) - McGinnis
 A Lady's Profession (1933) - Tony
 Gambling Ship (1933) - Blooey
 One Sunday Afternoon (1933) - Snappy Downer
 The Women in His Life (1933) - Lester
 Alice in Wonderland (1933) - Tweedledee
 Search for Beauty (1934) - Newspaper Reporter (scenes deleted)
 It Happened One Night (1934) - Oscar Shapeley
 Come On Marines! (1934) - Spud McGurke
 Twentieth Century (1934) - O'Malley
 Shoot the Works (1934) - Sailor Burke
 Elmer and Elsie (1934) - Rocky Cott
 I Sell Anything (1934) - Monk
 Wings in the Dark (1935) - Nick Williams
 Red Hot Tires (1935) - Bud Keene
 Four Hours to Kill! (1935) - Johnson
 Alibi Ike (1935) - Carey
 Front Page Woman (1935) - Toots O'Grady
 Two-Fisted (1935) - Chick Moran
 Woman Trap (1936) - Mopsy
 Border Flight (1936) - Calico Smith
 Three Cheers for Love (1936) - Doc "Short Circuit" Wilson
 Three Married Men (1936) - Peter Cary
 Cain and Mabel (1936) - Reilly
 Clarence (1937) - Clarence Smith
 Murder Goes to College (1937) - Sim Perkins
 Night of Mystery (1937) - Sgt. Heath
 On Such a Night (1937) - Joe Flynn
 Partners in Crime (1937) - Sim Perkins
 Scandal Street (1938) - Austin Brown
 Dangerous to Know (1938) - Duncan
 Tip-Off Girls (1938) - Tom Benson aka Tommy Logan
 You and Me (1938) - Cuffy
 Thanks for the Memory (1938) - George Kent
 King of Chinatown (1939) - 'Rip' Harrigan
 Dancing Co-Ed (1939) - Joe Drews
 Everything's on Ice (1939) - Felix Miller
 That's Right—You're Wrong (1939) - Mal Stamp
 His Girl Friday (1940) - Reporter McCue
 Double Alibi (1940) - Jeremiah Jenkins
 Saturday's Children (1940) - Willie Sands
 They Drive by Night (1940) - "Irish" McGurn
 Ladies Must Live (1940) - Pete H. 'Pighead' Larrabee
 Meet the Missus (1940) - Joe Higgins
 Petticoat Politics (1941) - Joe Higgins
 Footsteps in the Dark (1941) - Monahan
 Black Eyes and Blues (1941 short) - Alfred Harmon
 The Gay Vagabond (1941) - Arthur Dixon, Jerry Dixon
 Half Shot at Sunrise (1941, Short) - Henry Warren
 Road to Happiness (1942) - Charley Grady
 A Tragedy at Midnight (1942) - Det. Lt. Cassidy
 Woman Of The Year (1942) - Phil Whittaker
 Yokel Boy (1942) - Al Devers
 You Can't Escape Forever (1942) - 'Mac' McTurk
 My Son, the Hero (1943) - Big-Time Morgan
 Stage Door Canteen (1943) - Himself
 Riding High (1943) - Shorty (uncredited)
 His Butler's Sister (1943) - Fields
 Old Acquaintance (1943) - Charlie Archer
 The Navy Way (1944) - Frankie Gimble
 Hi, Good Lookin'! (1944) - Archie
 Minstrel Man (1944) - Roscoe
 One Way to Love (1946) - Hobie Simmons
 I Ring Doorbells (1946) - Stubby
 Avalanche (1946) - Red Kelly
 Down Missouri Way (1946) - Press Agent
 Vigilantes of Boomtown (1947) - Billy Delaney
 That's My Man (1947) - Toby Gleeton
 The Inside Story (1948) - Eustace Peabody
 Devil's Cargo (1948) - Lt. Hardy
 Speed to Spare (1948) - Kangaroo
 Texas, Brooklyn & Heaven (1948) - Carmody
 Onionhead (1958) - 'Windy' Woods
 Man's Favorite Sport? (1964) - Major Phipps

References

External links

1891 births
1970 deaths
Male actors from California
American male film actors
American male silent film actors
American male television actors
Actors from San Bernardino, California
20th-century American male actors
Burials at Hollywood Forever Cemetery